Weekend on the Rocks is a live album by Dave Matthews Band.  It contains highlights of the four shows in four days the band performed at Red Rocks Amphitheatre in Morrison, Colorado on September 9–12, 2005.  The set is packaged on two CDs and one DVD.  However, a complete recording of the four shows, entitled The Complete Weekend on the Rocks, is available on eight discs.  This is the second officially released live recording of Dave Matthews Band concerts at Red Rocks Amphitheatre.  The first was Live at Red Rocks 8.15.95.

Track listing for Weekend on the Rocks

Disc one
 "The Stone" – 10:10
 "American Baby" – 4:31
 "Time of the Season" – 4:29
 "Say Goodbye" – 7:19
 "#34" – 5:51
 "Steady as We Go" – 4:18
 "Hunger for the Great Light" – 3:41
 "Bartender" – 16:37

Disc two
 "Don't Burn The Pig" – 7:01
 "You Never Know" – 7:10
 "Stand Up (For It)" – 4:22
 "#41" – 15:20
 "Stolen Away on 55th & 3rd" – 5:28
 "Smooth Rider" – 12:10
 "Halloween" – 4:55
 "Louisiana Bayou" – 9:00
 "Everyday" – 8:44

DVD
 "Stand Up (For It)"
 "Time of the Season"
 "Dreamgirl"
 "Everybody Wake Up (Our Finest Hour Arrives)"
 "Crash into Me"
 "So Much to Say" » "Anyone Seen the Bridge?"
 "Too Much"
 "Louisiana Bayou"
 "Recently"
 "Jimi Thing"

Track listing for The Complete Weekend on the Rocks
The Complete Weekend on the Rocks is an expanded version, containing all four shows on eight CDs and one DVD.  It is only available online, as opposed to the condensed version, which is more widely available.

Disc one (9/9/05)
 "Everyday" – 9:25
 "Time of the Season" – 4:28
 "Say Goodbye" – 7:13
 "Dreamgirl" – 10:25
 "Louisiana Bayou" – 7:49
 "The Stone" – 9:42
 "Stolen Away On 55th & 3rd" – 5:44
 "Bartender" – 16:43

Disc two (9/9/05)
 "What Would You Say" – 5:45
 "Everybody Wake Up (Our Finest Hour Arrives)" – 5:24
 "American Baby Intro" – 7:05
 "Dancing Nancies" – 10:35
 "Warehouse" – 10:10
 "So Much to Say" – 5:30
 "Too Much" – 5:43
 "Old Dirt Hill" - 6:58
 "Ants Marching" – 7:40

Disc three (9/10/05)
 "Seek Up" – 22:15
 "One Sweet World" – 6:09
 "Don't Drink the Water" – 6:37
 "Hunger for the Great Light" – 3:45
 "Rhyme & Reason" – 5:35
 "#34" – 5:58
 "Smooth Rider" – 8:39
 "Jimi Thing" – 19:19

Disc four (9/10/05)
 "Blackbird" – 9:58
 "Steady as We Go" – 4:07
 "Hello Again" – 8:06
 "Crash into Me" – 5:43
 "Louisiana Bayou" – 8:44
 "The Best of What's Around" – 5:52
 "American Baby" – 4:45
 "Tripping Billies" – 5:23
 "Where Are You Going" – 3:41
 "Two Step" – 18:04

Disc five (9/11/05)
 "Don't Burn The Pig" – 7:11
 "You Never Know" – 7:16
 "Stand Up" – 4:29
 "Grey Street" – 4:43
 "When The World Ends" – 3:36
 "Dreamgirl" – 9:19
 "Lie in Our Graves" – 15:39
 "Lover Lay Down" – 7:44
 "What You Are" – 9:07

Disc six (9/11/05)
 "Out of My Hands" – 4:28
 "#41" – 15:21
 "Granny" – 5:09
 "Halloween" – 4:52
 "Butterfly" – 2:48
 "Crush" – 14:02
 "Pantala Naga Pampa" – 0:39
 "Rapunzel" – 7:09
 "Louisiana Bayou" – 7:35
 "All Along the Watchtower" – 10:13

Disc seven (9/12/05)
 "Recently" – 8:27
 "Drive In Drive Out" – 6:35
 "Typical Situation" – 13:10
 "Everyday" – 8:27
 "Everybody Wake Up (Our Finest Hour Arrives)" – 5:56
 "Old Dirt Hill" – 7:38
 "Hunger for the Great Light" – 3:40
 "American Baby Intro" – 12:18
 "Dreamgirl" – 10:53

Disc eight (9/12/05)
 "Jimi Thing" – 22:39
 "Exodus" (with Robert Randolph, Ivan Neville & David CasT) – 19:02
 "Louisiana Bayou" (with Robert Randolph & David CasT) – 9:35
 "Smooth Rider" – 12:33
 "Too Much" – 6:00

Personnel
Dave Matthews Band
 Carter Beauford – drums, vocals
 Dave Matthews – guitar, vocals
 LeRoi Moore – horn, vocals
 Stefan Lessard – bass
 Boyd Tinsley – violin, vocals

Guest artists
 Robert Randolph – pedal steel
 Rashawn Ross – trumpet
 Butch Taylor – keyboards, vocals

Production

 John Alagia – mixing, producer
 Scott Campbell – mixing
 Coran Capshaw – executive producer
 C. Taylor Crothers – photography
 Mike Czaszwicz – engineer
 Rob Evans – digital assembly, digital editing
 Bruce Flohr – executive producer
 Terry Fryer – producer
 Patrick G. Jordan – executive producer
 Tosh Kasai – digital editing, engineer
 Chris Kress – digital assembly, digital editing
 Joe Lawlor – live recording
 Stephen Marcussen – mastering
 Hank Neuberger – producer
 Frank Pappalardo – engineer, mixing
 Jeff Romano – digital editing
 Brian Scheuble – mixing
 Joe Thomas – video director, video producer
 Stephen Warner – producer
 Stewart Whitmore – digital editing
 Fenton Williams – lighting design

Chart performance

References

Albums produced by John Alagía
Dave Matthews Band live albums
Dave Matthews Band video albums
2005 live albums
RCA Records live albums
Live video albums